Vučković (Cyrillic script: Вучковић), also spelled Vuckovic when diacritics are lost or Vuchkovich when transcribed, is a South Slavic patronymic surname derived from the name Vučko, "wolf cub". 

The surname may refer to:

Aljoša Vučković, Serbian actor
Bojan Vučković, Serbian chess Grandmaster
Bojan Vučković, Serbian footballer
Gene Vuckovich, American politician
Jelena Vučković, Serbian-American scientist
Lidija Vučković, Serbian basketball player
Marko Vuckovic, American footballer
Nebojša Vučković, Serbian football manager
Nenad Vučković (footballer), Croatian footballer
Nenad Vučković (handballer), Serbian handball player
Pete Vuckovic, British singer-songwriter
Severina Kojić, nee  Vučković, Croatian pop singer and actor
Slavko Vučković, Serbian footballer
Stephan Vuckovic, German athlete who competes in triathlon
Zdenka Vučković, Croatian pop singer

See also
 Vuckovich

Croatian surnames
Serbian surnames
Patronymic surnames